Fahie (normally ) is a surname derived from the Irish surname Ó Fathaigh.  Alternative derivations include Fahey, Fahy and Fay.
People named Fahie include:
 Andrew Fahie (born 1970), Premier of the British Virgin Islands
 Pauline Fahie (1910–1947), British writer and pilot
 Sir William Charles Fahie (1763 – 11 January 1833), Royal Naval officer

Anglicised Irish-language surnames